Yaw or yaws may refer to:

Measurement and technology

Movement about the vertical axis 
 Yaw angle (or yaw rotation), one of the angular degrees of freedom of any stiff body (for example a vehicle), describing rotation about the vertical axis
 Yaw (aviation), one of the aircraft principal axes of rotation, describing motion about the vertical axis of an aircraft (nose-left or nose-right angle measured from vertical axis)
 Yaw (ship motion), one of the ship motions' principal axes of rotation, describing motion about the vertical axis of a ship (bow-left or bow-right angle measured from vertical axis)
 Yaw rate (or yaw velocity), the angular speed of yaw rotation, measured with a yaw rate sensor
 Yawing moment, the angular momentum of a yaw rotation, important for adverse yaw in aircraft dynamics

Wind turbines 
 Yaw system, a yaw angle control system in wind turbines responsible for the orientation of the rotor towards the wind
 Yaw bearing, the most crucial and cost intensive component of modern horizontal axis wind turbine yaw systems
 Yaw drive, an important component of modern horizontal axis wind turbine yaw systems

Other technology 
 Yaws (web server)

People and religion 
 Yaw (ethnic group), a Burmese ethnic group
 Yaw (name), a Ghanaian given name for a boy born on Thursday
 Ellen Beach Yaw (1869–1947), a concert singer
 Eugene Yaw (born 1943), a Republican member of the Pennsylvania State Senate
 Yaw (god), a Levantine god

Other 
 Yaw-Yan, a Filipino martial art
 Yaws, a tropical disease
 CFB Shearwater (ICAO: CYAW), Shearwater, Nova Scotia Canada

See also
 Yours (disambiguation), various meanings, most prominently as a pronoun
 Yew (disambiguation)